Chong Kee Hiong (born 1966) is a Singaporean politician and accountant who has been serving as Treasurer of the PAP Community Foundation since 2020. A member of the governing People's Action Party (PAP), he has been the Member of Parliament (MP) representing the Bishan East division of Bishan–Toa Payoh GRC since 2015.

Education 
Chong was educated at Raffles Institution and Raffles Junior College before he received a scholarship from KPMG to study at the National University of Singapore, from which he graduated with a Bachelor of Accountancy. He also completed an Advanced Management Program at the Harvard Business School in 2008. He is a member of the Institute of Singapore Chartered Accountants.

Career 
Chong is the chief executive officer of Suntec Real Estate Investment Trust. He was the chairman of NTUC Foodfare. Before joining Suntec, Chong was the Chief Executive Officer of OUE Hospitality REIT Management Pte Ltd. Prior to this, Chong was the chief executive officer of The Ascott. Earlier in his career, he was the chief financial officer of Raffles Holdings. Chong started his career in audit as a graduate assistant at KPMG in 1990.

Political career 
On 12 August 2015, the People's Action Party (PAP) announced Chong as part of a five-member PAP team contesting in Bishan–Toa Payoh GRC in the 2015 general election after Wong Kan Seng, Hri Kumar and
Zainudin Nordin stepped down from their respective wards and politics.  Chong was elected into Parliament when the PAP team won 73.59% of the electorate's valid votes. Chong was elected as a Member of Parliament for Bishan–Toa Payoh GRC for a second term but as a four-member team in the 2020 general election after the PAP team garnered 67.26% of the valid votes. He was then appointed deputy chairman of the National Development Government Parliamentary Committee (GPC) in the 14th Parliament.

Personal life 
Chong grew up in a two-room Singapore Improvement Trust flat. He currently lives in a semi-detached house in Bishan East. Chong is the youngest of 11 siblings. He is married to Monica, whom he met at KPMG, and they have four sons.

References

External links 
 Chong Kee Hiong on Parliament of Singapore

People's Action Party politicians
1966 births
Living people
Raffles Institution alumni
Raffles Junior College alumni
National University of Singapore alumni
Members of the Parliament of Singapore